Kosovo made its Olympic debut as a member state in 2016. Its team is organized by the Olympic Committee of Kosovo (OCK), created in 1992 and recognized by the International Olympic Committee on 9 December 2014. It won its first medal in its debut appearance in 2016, when judoka Majlinda Kelmendi took gold in the women's -52 kg category. In the 2020 Tokyo Olympics, Nora Gjakova won gold in the women's judo -57 kg class, and Distria Krasniqi won gold in the women's judo -48 kg class.

History
In past Olympic Games, athletes born in what is now Kosovo participated as part of the Yugoslavian team. In the 1960 Summer Olympics, three football players born in Kosovo (Milutin Šoškić, Fahrudin Jusufi, and Vladimir Durković) won gold as part of the Yugoslavian national football team. The first  individual athlete from Kosovo who competed for Yugoslavia at the Olympics was boxer Mehmet Bogujevci in the 1980 Summer Olympics men's welterweight category, reaching the quarterfinals. In the 1984 Summer Olympics, boxer Aziz Salihu became the first individual athlete from Kosovo to win an Olympic medal, a bronze in the super heavyweight class. In the following 1988 Summer Olympics, Salihu became the first Kosovan individual athlete to participate for a third time, again in boxing. The world-renowned judo coach of Kosovo is Driton Kuka. The bronze medalist at the European Championship in 1990 and the World Cup in Hungary in 1991 was to participate for FR Yugoslavia in the 1992 Barcelona Olympics, but Kosovo pulled out its competitors because of the repression of ethnic Albanians by the regime of Slobodan Milosevic. Kosovo Albanian Luan Krasniqi won a bronze medal representing Germany in heavyweight boxing at the 1996 Summer Olympics in Atlanta. In the 2000 Summer Olympics in Sydney. Taip Ramadani became the first Kosovan Team athlete to represent Australia in Handball. Another Boxer with Kosovan descent would take place, with Naim Terbunja representing Sweden at the 2008 Summer Olympics. Fatmire Alushi, who was born in Kosovo, in Istog won a bronze medal while playing on the German women's football team at the 2008 Olympics in Beijing.  Kosovo Albanian Kosovare Asllani won silver medals twice in Football at the Summer Olympics, first at the 2016 Summer Olympics in Rio de Janeiro, representing the Sweden women's national football team. She achieved this feat again in the women's tournament in Tokyo.

After the breakup of Yugoslavia, the Olympic Committee of Kosovo (OCK) was established 1992. However, only Kosovo Serb athletes participated as part of the Olympic teams of Serbia and Montenegro and Serbia. On 17 February 2008, the Kosovan Parliament declared independence from Serbia. World junior champion in judo, Majlinda Kelmendi, qualified for the 2012 Summer Olympics. She wanted to compete under the flag of Kosovo, but OCK was not recognized by the International Olympic Committee (IOC) at the time. Also, the IOC turned down Kelmendi's request to compete as an independent athlete. Kelmendi chose instead to represent Albania. In which she couldn't win the first ever medal for Albania as she lost in the Round of Sixteen of this tournament.

In April 2013, the Brussels Agreement was concluded between the Serbian and Kosovan governments. Kosovo was recognised as a provisional member of the IOC on 22 October 2014, before becoming a full member on 9 December 2014. At that time, Kosovo was not a member or observer state of the United Nations, but it had gained diplomatic recognition as a sovereign state by 97 out of 193 UN member states. Kelmendi, who had gone on to become World and European judo champion in 2013 and 2014, carried Kosovo's flag during the Parade of Nations in the opening ceremonies in both Rio 2016 and Tokyo 2020.

Serbia protested Kosovo's admission to the IOC, as it officially claims that Kosovo is an autonomous province of Serbia. However, Serbia, considering the harmful effects of Yugoslavia's expulsion in 1992, decided against boycotting the 2016 Summer Olympics as a consequence.

Kosovo competed for the first time as a recognized Olympic nation at the 2016 Summer Olympics in Rio de Janeiro. In total eight athletes competed in various sports for Kosovo. Kosovo won one gold medal by Kelmendi in the women's -52kg class, the first Olympic medal for Kosovo in its history. As Kosovo finished their debut in the Summer Olympics in Rio de Janeiro in the 54th place.

The Olympic Committee of Kosovo made its Winter Olympic debut at the 2018 Games in Pyeongchang. Albin Tahiri was the flag-bearer at the 2018 Winter Olympics opening ceremony.

Kosovo competed in the Tokyo Games in 2021, with five male and six female competitors. Majlinda Kelmendi and Akil Gjakova were the flag-bearers in the Parade of Nations.

Kosovo won two gold medals in the 2020 Summer Olympics, both in judo. Distria Krasniqi won the first gold medal for Kosovo in women's -48kg event. Nora Gjakova won the second gold medal for Kosovo in the women's -57kg event, the third gold medal overall for Kosovo at the Olympic Games. They won their two medals after three days of this competition,  ranking them 7th on the Olympic Medal table, that particular day.  Kosovo finished the 2020 Summer Olympics in Tokio in the 42nd place. Their highest finish so far, as an nation.

Kosovo competed at the 2022 Winter Olympics held in Beijing. Its Olympic team consisted of two athletes, one male and one female. Albin Tahiri competed in four alpine ski events. Kiana Kryeziu became the first woman in the history of Kosovo to compete at the Winter Olympics, in the women's slalom. Albin Tahiri achieved the best result for Kosovo at the Winter Olympics in the men's combined event with a 15th-place finish. His second best finish came in the men's giant slalom where he finished 30th.

Participation

Timeline of participation

Medal tables

Medals by Summer Games

Medals by Winter Games

Medals by sport

List of medalists

List of total medal winners from Kosovo in its history

Olympic participants

Summer Olympics

Winter Olympics

Flagbearers

See also 
Kosovo at the Paralympics
Special Olympics Kosovo
Kosovo at the Youth Olympics
Kosovo at the Mediterranean Games
Kosovo at the European Games
Kosovo at the Jeux de la Francophonie
Kosovo at the Universiade
Sport in Kosovo
Sport in Pristina

Notes

References

External links
 
 
 
 Official website

 
Nations at the Olympics
Kosovo at multi-sport events